Chris Garrett (born June 12, 1998) is an American football outside linebacker who is a free agent. He played college football at Concordia–St. Paul and was drafted by the Rams in the seventh round, 252nd overall, in the 2021 NFL Draft.

Professional career

Los Angeles Rams
Garrett was drafted by the Los Angeles Rams in the seventh round, 252nd overall, of the 2021 NFL Draft.  On May 16, 2021, Garrett signed his four-year rookie contract with Los Angeles. Garrett won his first Super Bowl ring when the Rams defeated the Cincinnati Bengals in Super Bowl LVI. He was waived on August 30, 2022.

Minnesota Vikings
On September 14, 2022, Garrett signed with the Minnesota Vikings practice squad. He was released on January 3, 2023.

Seattle Seahawks
On January 10, 2023, Garrett was signed to the Seattle Seahawks practice squad. He signed a reserve/future contract on January 17, 2023.

References

1998 births
Living people
Players of American football from Milwaukee
American football defensive ends
American football outside linebackers
Concordia Golden Bears football players
Los Angeles Rams players
Minnesota Vikings players
Seattle Seahawks players